

Season summary
1860 Munich finished fourth in the Bundesliga and qualified for the Champions League third qualifying round.

Kit
1860 Munich's kit was manufactured by Nike and sponsored by tourism company FTI.

First team squad
Squad at end of season

Left club during season

Competitions

Legend

Bundesliga

League table

References

Notes

TSV 1860 Munich seasons
TSV 1860 Munchen